Route 525 is a  long east–west secondary highway in the northwest portion of New Brunswick, Canada.

The route's northern terminus is at Route 515 in the community of Sainte-Marie-de-Kent. The road crosses the Bouctouche River between the communities of Upper Buctouche and Roy. The road travels northeast as Coates Mills South Road before turning southeast near the community of Roy, where it is called Champ Dore Road. Route 525 passes through the community of Champdore before ending at Route 115 in Saint-Antoine.

History

See also

References

525
525